Durand Jones & The Indications is an American contemporary R&B and soul group founded by the core songwriting trio of singer Durand Jones, singer/drummer Aaron Frazer, and guitarist Blake Rhein. Formed in 2012, the band came to prominence as part of the soul revivalist movement around the time of the reissue of their debut album in 2018. Their second album American Love Call was released in March 2019, followed by Private Space in July 2021.

History 
Blake Rhein and Aaron Frazer, two students at Indiana University's Jacobs School of Music, developed a musical relationship with Durand Jones in the early 2010s based on their shared interests in songwriting and old soul 45s. Rhein had met Jones, a Louisiana native doing postgraduate studies for classical saxophone, while both were working with Indiana University's Soul Revue. Rhein and Frazer would later bring in the two other members of their blues rock band Charlie Patton's War, bassist Kyle Houpt and organist Justin Hubler, to form The Indications. They wrote what would be their debut album between Fall 2012 and 2014, recording on a Tascam four-track recorder. Concurrently, Charlie Patton's War toured regionally and nationally; between tours, Durand Jones & The Indications played their "one and only show" in May 2014.

In 2015, the band was approached by Ohio soul label Colemine Records about releasing an album of music from their earlier sessions. They released their first 45 in 2015 and followed with their debut album Durand Jones & The Indications the following year. They played a single show in Bloomington in April 2016 before going off to separate careers. Following support from critics and independent record stores, the band would reunite and toured throughout 2017, primarily in the Midwest and the South. In 2017, Steve Okonski replaced Justin Hubler as organist. Their album was reissued by Bloomington label Dead Oceans in 2018 with new live material.

The Chicano lowrider community, noted for their love of oldies, were early champions of The Indications and began circulating their music as early as 2016. In tribute, the band released the b-side "Cruisin' to the Park" in 2019. The track was later released as a single with an accompanying music video featuring California lowriders. In 2021, they released a Spanish language version, "Cruisin' to the Parque," with former tourmate Y La Bamba.

During July and August 2018, the band recorded their second album in Brooklyn, New York and focused on developing a "vocal group sound." Their record, American Love Call, was released in March 2018. The band toured continuously through 2020, with Mike Montgomery joining as bassist at the end of 2019. Among other singles released in 2020, the band put out a studio version of their song "Power to the People" two weeks ahead of the 2020 presidential election; the demo version was originally released as part of the 2017 campaign Our First 100 Days.

Recorded in January 2020, Frazer released a Dan Auerbach-produced solo album in January 2021, at which time he noted that a new Durand Jones & The Indications album was in the works. He previously released music under the alias The Flying Stars of Brooklyn NY. Jones appeared as a guest vocalist on a number of tracks beginning in 2020, including on The Bamboos 2021 album. Of note, Rhein has worked as a researcher for The Numero Group and produced a number of reissue compilations for the label. 

In May 2021, the band announced that their third record, Private Space, would be released July 30, 2021 and released the lead single "Witchoo". The ten track album was recorded in New York City at Diamond Mine and features a more disco and modern soul-inspired sound. The album was written and produced by Jones, Frazer, Rhein, and Okonski with contributions from bassist Michael Montgomery as well as arrangers Ginger Dolden and Peter Lanctot, harpist Brandee Younger, and Eli "Paperboy" Reed, among others.

Members 

 Durand Jones – vocals (2012–present)
 Aaron Frazer – vocals, drums, percussion, synthesizer (2012–present)
 Blake Rhein – guitar, synthesizer, percussion, vocals (2012–present)
 Steve Okonski – organ, piano, synthesizer, vocals (2017–present)
Michael Isvara Montgomery – bass, vocals (2019–present)
Former members
 Kyle Houpt – bass (2013–2019)
Justin Hubler – organ, piano (2013–2017)

Discography

Studio albums

Live albums

Singles

Awards

References 

American soul musical groups
American contemporary R&B musical groups
Dead Oceans artists
Musical groups from Indiana